Our Lady of Candelaria Cathedral, also called Camagüey Cathedral, is a Roman Catholic cathedral and minor basilica in Camagüey, Cuba, located in Ignacio Agramonte Park.

History
The building was built in the early eighteenth century, but has been rebuilt several times. The current appearance of the cathedral is the result of work done in 1864. After Pope John Paul II visited Cuba in 1998, several donations for the renovation of the cathedral  were performed, which today is in very good condition.

The church is dedicated to the patron saint of the city, the Virgen de la Candelaria. The most striking feature is the huge bell tower, topped with a statue of Christ.

The temple follows the Roman or Latin rite and is the seat of the Metropolitan Archdiocese of Camagüey (Archidioecesis Camagueyensis) which was raised to its current status in 1998 by the bull "Maiori spirituali".

The cathedral is part of the historic center of Camagüey, a UNESCO World Heritage Site since 2008. In January 2014 Pope Francis also conferred on it the title of minor basilica.

See also
Roman Catholicism in Cuba
Our Lady of Candelaria Cathedral

References

External links

Roman Catholic cathedrals in Cuba
Buildings and structures in Camagüey
Basilica churches in Cuba
19th-century Roman Catholic church buildings in Cuba